Clark is an English language surname, ultimately derived from the Latin with historical links to England, Scotland, and Ireland clericus meaning "scribe", "secretary" or a scholar within a religious order, referring to someone who was educated. Clark evolved from "clerk". First records of the name are found in 12th-century England. The name has many variants.

Clark is the twenty-seventh most common surname in the United Kingdom, including placing fourteenth in Scotland. Clark is also an occasional given name, as in the case of Clark Gable.

According to the 1990 United States Census, Clark was the twenty-first most frequently encountered surname, accounting for 0.23% of the population.

Disambiguation pages
Anne Clark (disambiguation), multiple people
Brian Clark (disambiguation), multiple people
Cameron Clark (disambiguation), multiple people
Charles Clark (disambiguation), multiple people
Chris Clark (disambiguation), multiple people
Clive Clark (disambiguation), multiple people
Colin Clark (disambiguation), multiple people
Douglas Clark (disambiguation), multiple people
David Clark (disambiguation), multiple people
Dick Clark (disambiguation), multiple people
Edward Clark (disambiguation), multiple people
Eugene Clark (disambiguation), multiple people
George Clark (disambiguation), multiple people
Gregory Clark (disambiguation), multiple people
Jack Clark (disambiguation), multiple people
James Clark (disambiguation), multiple people
Jason Clark (disambiguation), multiple people
Jeff Clark (disambiguation), multiple people
Jim Clark (disambiguation), multiple people
John Clark (disambiguation), multiple people
Jonathan Clark (disambiguation), multiple people
Joseph Clark (disambiguation), multiple people
Ken Clark (disambiguation), multiple people
Kenneth Clark (disambiguation), multiple people
Lee Clark (disambiguation), multiple people
Mary Clark (disambiguation), multiple people
Paul Clark (disambiguation), multiple people
Robert Clark (disambiguation), multiple people
Ryan Clark (disambiguation), multiple people
Sally Clark (disambiguation), multiple people
Samuel Clark (disambiguation), multiple people
Simon Clark (disambiguation), multiple people
Terry Clark (disambiguation), multiple people
Thomas Clark (disambiguation), multiple people
William Clark (disambiguation), multiple people

Arts and literature
 Alton Dorian Clark (born 1984), better known as American hip-hop musician Dorian
Andy Clark (musician), British musician
Ann Clarke (born 1944), Canadian artist
 Annie Erin Clark, better known under her stage name St. Vincent (musician) (born 1982), American singer, songwriter, and musician
Appleton P. Clark Jr. (1865–1955), American architect
Blake Clark (born 1946), American actor and stand-up comedian
Bob Clark (Benjamin "Bob" Clark) (1941–2007), an American director
Buddy Clark (1911–1949), American singer
Catherine Clark (born 1976), Canadian television host
Clark (musician) (born 1979), British musician, who is also known as Chris Clark
Christian Clark (born 1978), Australian actor
Claudine Clark (born 1941), American R&B singer and performer of the 1962 hit record "Party Lights"
Cora Mildred Maris Clark (1885–1967), New Zealand hockey player and nurse
Dave Clark (musician) (born 1939), English drummer of The Dave Clark Five
 Dorothy Park Clark (1899–1983), American novelist who wrote under the pen name Clark McMeekin
Dodie Clark (born 1995), English musician, YouTuber, and author
Donté Clark, American poet, actor
Ernest Clark (1912–1994), British actor
Florence Anderson Clark (1835–1918), American author, newspaper editor, librarian, university dean
Guy Clark (1941–2016), American musician, songwriter, recording artist, and performer
Harriet E. Clark (1850-1945), American teacher and author 
Helen Taggart Clark (1849–1918), American journalist, poet
Hilda Margery Clarke (1926–2022), English painter and curator
Jean Clark (artist) (1902–1999), English artist 
Joseph Benwell Clark (1857–1938), English artist 
Joshua Clark, (born 1980), American writer
Ken Clark (actor), (1921–2009), American actor
Laura Lee Clark (born 1964), American interior designer
Libby Clark (?-2012), American journalist
Louis Clark (1947–2021), musician and conductor with The Orchestra (successor band to ELO and ELO Part II)
Robin Clark (pop singer), (born 1949), 1960s American pop singer
Roy Clark (1933–2018), American singer and musician
Spencer Treat Clark (born 1987), American actor
Stephen R. L. Clark (born 1945), English philosopher
Steve Clark (1960–1991), British guitarist for Def Leppard
Tom Clark (journalist), Canadian television journalist
Vicky A. Clark, American art curator
Vinnie B. Clark (1878–1971), American educator and author
Wallis Clark (1882–1961), English actor
William Clark (artist) (1803–1883), Scottish artist

Business
Allen George Clark (1898–1962), British businessman
Arnold Clark (1927–2017), Scottish businessman
Hilda Clark (model) (1872–1932), American Coca-Cola advertising spokesperson
Jonas Gilman Clark (1815–1900), American businessman and the founder of Clark University
Lance Clark (1936–2018), English businessman, of the shoe retailers Clarks
Myron Henry Clark (1881–1953), American management consultant 
Shawn M. Clark (born ), American organizational theorist

Politics and law
Abraham Clark (1725–1794), American politician and Revolutionary War figure
Alan Clark (1928–1999), British Conservative politician and author, son of Kenneth Clark
Alistair Clark, Lord Clark, Scottish judge, senator of the College of Justice
Augusta Clark (1932–2013), American librarian, lawyer and politician
Barbara M. Clark (1939–2016), New York politician
Benjamin S. W. Clark (1829–1912), a New York politician
Billy J. Clark (1778–1866), a New York physician and politician 
Boyd A. Clark (1918–1978), an American politician and jurist
Darius Clark (1798–1871), New York physician and politician
Frank M. Clark (1915–2003), American Congressman
Gavin Brown Clark (1846–1930), MP for Caithness
Greenleaf Clark (1835–1904), American jurist
Helen Clark (born 1950), prime minister of New Zealand from 1999 to 2008
Horace Clark (assemblyman), 1830s New York politician
Horace F. Clark (1815–1873), US Congressman from New York
Isabella Clark (1809–1857), wife of Prime Minister of Canada Sir John A. Macdonald
Janet H. Clark (born 1941), Minnesota politician
Joe Clark (born 1939), former prime minister of Canada
Karen Clark (politician) (born 1945), American politician from Minnesota
Katy Clark (born 1967), Scottish politician and trade union official
Kelly Clark (lawyer) (1957–2013), American lawyer
Maureen Harding Clark (born 1946), Irish jurist
Newcomb Clark (1840–1913), Michigan politician
Orville Clark (1801–1862), New York politician
Ramsey Clark (1927–2021), US attorney general and activist
Rita Clark (1915–2008), member of the Pennsylvania House of Representatives
Satterlee Clark, American politician
Septima Poinsette Clark (1898–1987), American educator and voting registration leader
 Sir Terence Clark (born 1934), British retired diplomat and writer
Tom C. Clark (1899–1977), US attorney general, U.S. Supreme Court justice
Zenas Clark (1795–1864), New York politician

Science and medicine
Adam Clark, American meteorologist
Benjamin Preston Clark (1860–1939), an American entomologist
Bracy Clark (1771–1860), English veterinary surgeon specialising in the horse
Cynthia Clark (born 1942), American statistician
Daniel Kinnear Clark (1822–1896), Scottish railway mechanical engineer
Duncan W. Clark (1910–2007), American public health specialist
Gerry Clark (1927–1999), New Zealand sailor and ornithologist
Grahame Clark (1907–1995), British archaeologist
Hamlet Clark (1823–1867), English entomologist
Hilda Clark (doctor) (1881–1955), Quaker physician and humanitarian
Hubert Lyman Clark (1870–1947), American zoologist
Jeanne Clark, American internist and physician-scientist
Judson Freeman Clark (1870–1942), Canadian forester and mycologist
Leslie J. Clark (1924–2003), British engineer and founder of Parvalux
Lynn G. Clark (born 1956), American botanist
Noel A. Clark (born 1940), American physicist
Wilfrid Le Gros Clark (1895–1971), British palaeoanthropologist

Sports
Alysha Clark (born 1987), American-Israeli basketball player
Babe Clark, American football player
Caitlin Clark (born 2002), American basketball player
Calum Clark (born 1989), English rugby union player
Carmel Clark (born 1965), New Zealand swimmer
Chuck Clark (born 1995), American football player
Chuck Clark (ice hockey) (1891–1970), British-born Canadian ice hockey player
Ciaran Clark (born 1989), Irish football player
Corrie Clark (born 1982), American breaststroke swimmer
Dallas Clark, American football player
Damone Clark (born 2000), American football player
Daniel Clark (born 1988), British basketball player
Darion Clark (born 1994), American football player
Duncan Clark (athlete) (1915–2003), Scottish hammer thrower
Dwight Clark (1957–2018), American football player
Earl Clark, American basketball player
Elky Clark (1898–1956), Scottish boxer of the 1920s 
Emily Clark (born 1995), Canadian ice hockey player
Frank Clark (footballer), English football player
Ginger Clark (1879–1943), American baseball pitcher
Glenn Clark (born 1969), Canadian coach of Toronto Rock
Hannah Clark (born 1990), English cricketer
Jaylen Clark (born 2001), American basketball player
Jeremy Clark (defensive back) (born 1994), American football player
Kelly Clark (born 1983), American snowboarder
Kihei Clark (born 2000), American–Filipino basketball player
Le'Raven Clark (born 1993), American football player
Leon Clark (basketball), American basketball player
Ocky Clark (born 1960), American middle-distance runner
Otey Clark (1915–2010), American baseball pitcher
R. Foster Clark, American college sports coach
Ranza Clark (born 1961), Canadian middle-distance runner
Roger Clark, British rally driver
Sherm Clark (1899–1980), American Olympic rower and rear admiral
Stuart Clark (born 1975), Australian cricketer
Wendel Clark (born 1966), retired Canadian ice hockey player
Will Clark (born 1964), American baseball player
Zoey Clark (born 1994), British sprinter

Other
Alice Clark (historian) (1874–1934), English suffragist and historian
Annie W. Clark (1843-1907), American social reformer
Alister Clark (1864–1949), Australian rose-breeder
Clark Olofsson (born 1947), Swedish criminal
Davis Wasgatt Clark (1812–1871), American bishop of the Methodist Episcopal Church
Felton Grandison Clark (1903–1970), African-American university president
Harold M. Clark (1890–1919), American army major
Hugh Massey Clark (1886–1956), New York philatelist
Hulda Regehr Clark, (1928–2009), alternative medicine practitioner
Joseph Samuel Clark (1871–1944), African-American university president
Manning Clark (1915–1991), Australian historian
Mark W. Clark (1896–1984), American army general in World War 2 (Italy) and the Korean War
Nada Hazel Clark (1922–1964), New Zealand trade unionist
Nancy B. Clark, Massachusetts philatelist, president of Cardinal Spellman Philatelic Museum
R. Scott Clark (born 1961) American seminary professor
Theresa Mathilde Clark (–1953), New York philatelist, spouse of Hugh Massey Clark
Wesley Clark (born 1944), American army general in the Vietnam War and Kosovo
Carlos Clark Van Leer (1865–1953), American military officer

Fictional characters
 David Clark, a character in the 2013 American crime comedy movie We're the Millers
John Clark (Tom Clancy character), character in Tom Clancy's Ryanverse
Tracy Clark, fictional character from The CW primetime drama 90210
Clark Kent, secret identity of DC Superhero Superman
Clark Griswold, fictional character from National Lampoon's Vacation film series.

See also
The Clark Sisters, American gospel vocalists from Detroit
Clark (TV series), Swedish TV drama series produced by Netflix 
Clark (taxonomic authority)
Clarke
Justice Clark (disambiguation)
Clerke (disambiguation)
Karen Clark Sheard (born 1960), American Grammy Award-winning singer

References

External links 
 Clark(e) Surname DNA Project
 

English-language surnames
Occupational surnames
Surnames of English origin
Surnames of Scottish origin
English-language occupational surnames